John Fuhr (September 9, 1928 – February 1, 2017) was an American politician who served in the Colorado House of Representatives from 1967 to 1975. He served as Speaker of the Colorado House of Representatives from 1971 to 1975.

He died on February 1, 2017, in Spearfish, South Dakota at age 88.

References

1928 births
2017 deaths
Speakers of the Colorado House of Representatives
Republican Party members of the Colorado House of Representatives